The 1893 Syracuse Orangemen football team represented Syracuse University during the 1893 college football season. The team captain was George H. Bond.

Schedule

References

Syracuse
Syracuse Orange football seasons
Syracuse Orangemen football